Bruce Wightman (5 March 1925 – 8 January 2009) was a New Zealand actor and expert on Bram Stoker who co-founded the Dracula Society.

Early life

Coming from a theatrical family, Wightman spent most of his adult life on stage, touring many theatres. In England, he appeared in many films (listed below) and TV shows including ITV Television Playhouse, Hancock's Half Hour, Sunday Night Theatre, Dixon of Dock Green, Armchair Theatre, No Hiding Place, Citizen James, Boyd Q.C., The Rag Trade, Suspense, Taxi!, First Night, Crane, Danger Man, Sykes and a..., The Dick Emery Show, Doctor Who, Theatre 625 and Comedy Playhouse.

The Dracula Society

With fellow actor Bernard Davies, Wightman formed The Dracula Society in October 1973, whose purpose was to encourage popular interest in Gothic literature as opposed to Gothic movies. The society was founded to organise Dracula-themed tours of Transylvania, which Bruce ran during the 1970s and 1980s, being awarded Guide of Honour, Romania in February 1981.

The society meets regularly five times a year but also organises occasional one-off events, and trips to locations in the UK and Europe. Honorary members include Caroline Munro, Mark Gatiss, Monty Berman, Michael Carreras and horror legends Vincent Price, Peter Cushing and Christopher Lee (as its president).

Wightman became interested in Dracula after seeing the 1931 film adaptation as a young man (calling its star, Bela Lugosi, the definitive Dracula). In 1977, Wightman appeared in the BBC's adaptation of Count Dracula (playing a coach passenger), as well as working in an advisory capacity on the production.

Later life

In the 1990s, Wightman lived in Bulgaria, working as a journalist and art critic. He returned to his native New Zealand in 2001 to continue writing about the career of Bram Stoker. However, he was living in Australia at the time of his death in 2009. He is buried in Emu Park Cemetery.

Filmography

 Blood of the Vampire (1958) - Third Guard (as Bruce Whiteman)
 I'm All Right Jack (1959) - Shop Steward
 Caught in the Net (1960) - Tom
 Suspect (1960) a.k.a. The Risk - Phil the Barman
 Jigsaw (1962) - 3rd Press Man (uncredited)
 Ladies Who Do (1963) - Bulldozer Driver
 You Must Be Joking! (1965) - Cleaner at Racetrack (uncredited)
 Runaway Railway (1966) - Llewellyn
 Confessions of a Window Cleaner (1974) - Café Owner

References

External links
 
 Bruce Wightman at Theatricalia
Dracula Society

1925 births
2009 deaths
New Zealand male film actors
New Zealand male television actors
20th-century New Zealand male actors
New Zealand emigrants to the United Kingdom
New Zealand expatriates in Australia